This is a list of castles, fortresses and towers in Greece.

Castles/Fortresses

Towers

Bibliography 
 Forbes-Boyd, Eric "In Crusader Greece: A Tour of the Castles of the Morea", 1964
 Eustasiades, "Fortresses and Castles of Greece: Eastern central Greece: Attica, Boeotia, Phthiotis, Phocis; Thessaly; Macedonia; Thrace", 1972
 Hetherington, Paul "Byzantine and Medieval Greece: Churches, Castles, and Art of the Mainland and the Peloponnese", 1991
 Paradissis, Alexander "Fortresses and Castles of Greece: Southern and West Central Greece", 1996
 Andrews, Kevin "Castles of the Morea", 2006
 Brooks, Allan "Castles of Northwest Greece", 2013
 Nicolle, David "Crusader Castles in Cyprus, Greece and the Aegean 1191–1571", 2013

External links 
 Castles in Greece (interactive guide)

See also 
 List of castles
 List of gates in Greece

References

Greece
Castles
Greece
Castles